This is a list of years in Spanish television.

Twenty-first century

Twentieth century

See also 
 List of years in Spain
 Lists of Spanish films
 List of years in television

Television
Television in Spain by year
Spanish television